Jason Trevisan (born 3 January 1967) is a Maltese judoka. He competed at the 1988 Summer Olympics and the 1992 Summer Olympics.

References

External links
 

1967 births
Living people
Maltese male judoka
Olympic judoka of Malta
Judoka at the 1988 Summer Olympics
Judoka at the 1992 Summer Olympics
Place of birth missing (living people)